Hatsik is a village in the Akhuryan Municipality of the Shirak Province of Armenia.

Demographics

Natural conditions 
The climate is temperate. Winters are long and cold. There are severe winds snow storms. Blach tuff and coal reserves are in the area. The lowest temperature of -25% to +35%. The village is in a seismic zone where earthquakes are frequent.

References 

World Gazeteer: Armenia – World-Gazetteer.com

Populated places in Shirak Province